Tenuibacillus  is a genus of bacteria from the family of Bacillaceae.

References

Bacillaceae
Bacteria genera
Taxa described in 2005